Abraham's Well is a historical water well in Beersheba,  Israel, associated with the biblical narrative of Abraham. Its structure houses the archaeology museum of Beersheba.

History

According to the Hebrew Bible, Abraham's well was seized by Abimelech's men, and Isaac’s servants also dug a well at Beersheba.

The well is near the Old City of Beersheba and a wadi, Nahal Be'er Sheva, on the road to Neve Noy. It was described by Edward Robinson in 1838. In 1897, a local sheikh built a house above the well.

Travellers' descriptions
Edward Robinson's description of the site: 
"These wells are some distance apart; they are circular, and stoned up with solid masonry. The larger one is twelve and a half feet in diameter and forty-four and a half feet deep to the surface of the water, sixteen feet of which, at the bottom, is excavated in the solid rock. The other well lies fifty-five rods W.S.W., and is five feet in diameter and forty-two feet deep. The water in both is pure and sweet, and in great abundance; the finest, indeed, we had found since leaving Sinai... Here then is the place where the patriarchs Abraham, Isaac, and Jacob often dwelt! Here Abraham dug perhaps this very well; and journeyed from hence with Isaac to Mount Moriah, to offer him up there in sacrifice." 

It was also described by Claude Reignier Conder in the late 19th century: 
"...the principal well, which is twelve feet three inches in diameter, and over forty-five feet deep, lined with rings of masonry to a depth of twenty-eight feet. A second well, five feet in diameter, exists about 300 yards to the west, and on the east is a third, which is dry, twenty-three feet deep, and nine feet two inches in diameter. The sides of all the wells are furrowed by the ropes of the water-drawers; but we made one discovery which was rather disappointing, namely, that the masonry is not very ancient. Fifteen courses down, on the south side of the large well, there is a stone with an inscription in Arabic, on a tablet dated, as well as I could make out, 505 A.H., or in the twelfth century. This stone must be at least as old as those at the mouth, which are furrowed with more than a hundred channels by the ropes of seven centuries of water-drawers."

See also
Archaeology of Israel
Tourism in Israel

References

External sources 

   Abrahams Well International Visitors Center

Beersheba
Archaeological sites in Israel
2013 establishments
Museums in Beersheba
Water wells in Israel
Abraham
Water and religion
Archaeological museums in Israel